The Summer Girl is a lost 1916 silent film comedy drama directed by Edwin August and starring Mollie King. It was produced by Peerless Pictures Studios and distributed by World Pictures.

Cast
Mollie King - Mary Anderson
Arthur Ashley - Bruce Haldeman
Dave Ferguson - Smythe Addison
Ruby Hoffman - Katheryn Green
Harold Entwistle - Mr. Anderson
Dora Mills Adams - Mrs. Anderson

References

External links

1916 films
American silent feature films
Lost American films
Films directed by Edwin August
World Film Company films
American black-and-white films
1910s English-language films
1916 comedy-drama films
1916 lost films
Lost comedy-drama films
1910s American films
Silent American comedy-drama films